Hindustani is the lingua franca of northern India and Pakistan, and through its two standardized registers, Hindi and Urdu, a co-official language of India and co-official and national language of Pakistan respectively. Phonological differences between the two standards are minimal.

Vowels

Hindustani natively possesses a symmetrical ten-vowel system. The distinction between short and long vowels is often described as tenseness, with short vowels being lax, and long vowels being tense.

Vowel  

 is often realized more open than mid , i.e. as near-open .

Vowel  

This contrast is often not realized by Urdu speakers, and always neutralized in Hindi (where both sounds uniformly correspond to ).

The opposition of length in the close vowels has been neutralized in word-final position, only allowing long close vowels in final position. As a result, Sanskrit loans which originally have a short close vowel are realized with a long close vowel, e.g.

Vowels ,  

Among sources for this article, pictured to the right, uses , while  and  use . Despite this, the Hindustani vowel system is quite similar to that of English, in contrast to the consonants.

This change is part of the prestige dialect of Delhi, but may not occur for every speaker. Here are some examples of this process:

Vowels ,  

It differs from the vowel  in that it is a short vowel. One or both of the schwas will become  giving the pronunciation .

Some Eastern dialects kept  as diphthongs, pronouncing them as [aɪ~əɪ, aʊ~əʊ].

Nasalization of vowels 

As in French and Portuguese, there are nasalized vowels in Hindustani. There is disagreement over the issue of the nature of nasalization (barring English-loaned  which is never nasalized).  presents four differing viewpoints:

 there is phonemic nasalization of all vowels;
 all vowel nasalization is predictable (i.e. allophonic);
 Nasalized long vowel phonemes occur word-finally and before voiceless stops; instances of nasalized short vowels and of nasalized long vowels before voiced stops (the latter, presumably because of a deleted nasal consonant) are allophonic.

Masica supports this last view.

Consonants

Hindustani has a core set of 28 consonants inherited from earlier Indo-Aryan. Supplementing these are two consonants that are internal developments in specific word-medial contexts, and seven consonants originally found in loan words, whose expression is dependent on factors such as status (class, education, etc.) and cultural register (Modern Standard Hindi vs Urdu).

Most native consonants may occur geminate (doubled in length; exceptions are ). Geminate consonants are always medial and preceded by one of the interior vowels (that is, or ).

For the English speaker, a notable feature of the Hindustani consonants is that there is a four-way distinction of phonation among plosives, rather than the two-way distinction found in English. The phonations are:

The last is commonly called "voiced aspirate", though  notes that,
"Evidence from experimental phonetics, however, has demonstrated that the two types of sounds involve two distinct types of voicing and release mechanisms. The series of so-called voice aspirates should now properly be considered to involve the voicing mechanism of murmur, in which the air flow passes through an aperture between the arytenoid cartilages, as opposed to passing between the ligamental vocal bands."
The murmured consonants are believed to be a reflex of murmured consonants in Proto-Indo-European, a phonation that is absent in all branches of the Indo-European family except Indo-Aryan and Armenian.

 Notes
 Marginal and non-universal phonemes are in parentheses.
  is lateral  for some speakers.
  is post-velar.

In intervocalic position, it may have a single contact and be described as a flap , but it may also be a clear trill, especially in word-initial and syllable-final positions, and geminate  is always a trill in Arabic and Persian loanwords, e.g. ( –  'little') versus well-trilled   ( –  'particle'). The palatal and velar nasals  occur only in consonant clusters, where each nasal is followed by a homorganic stop, as an allophone of a nasal vowel followed by a stop, and in Sanskrit loanwords.

The fricative  in Hindustani is typically voiced (as ), especially when surrounded by vowels, but there is no phonemic difference between this voiced fricative and its voiceless counterpart  (Hindustani's ancestor Sanskrit has such a phonemic distinction).

Hindustani also has a phonemic difference between the dental plosives and the so-called retroflex plosives. The dental plosives in Hindustani are laminal-denti alveolar as in Spanish, and the tongue-tip must be well in contact with the back of the upper front teeth.

In some Indo-Aryan languages, the plosives  and the flaps  are allophones in complementary distribution, with the former occurring in initial, geminate and postnasal positions and the latter occurring in intervocalic and final positions.

Native Hindi speakers are usually unaware of the allophonic distinctions, though these are apparent to native English speakers.

External borrowing
Sanskrit borrowing has reintroduced  and  into formal Modern Standard Hindi. They occur primarily in Sanskrit loanwords and proper nouns.

Loanwords from Persian (including some words which Persian itself borrowed from Arabic or Turkish) introduced six consonants, . Being Persian in origin, these are seen as a defining feature of Urdu, although these sounds officially exist in Hindi and modified Devanagari characters are available to represent them. Among these, also found in English and Portuguese loanwords, are now considered well-established in Hindi; indeed,  appears to be encroaching upon and replacing  even in native (non-Persian, non-English, non-Portuguese) Hindi words as well as many other Indian languages such as Bengali, Gujarati and Marathi, as happened in Greek with phi.  This  to  shift also occasionally occurs in Urdu. While [z] is a foreign sound, it is also natively found as an allophone of /s/ beside voiced consonants.

The other three Persian loans, are still considered to fall under the domain of Urdu, and are also used by many Hindi speakers; however, some Hindi speakers assimilate these sounds to  respectively. The sibilant  is found in loanwords from all sources (Arabic, English, Portuguese, Persian, Sanskrit) and is well-established. The failure to maintain  by some Hindi speakers (often non-urban speakers who confuse them with ) is considered nonstandard.

Being the main sources from which Hindustani draws its higher, learned terms– English, Sanskrit, Arabic, and to a lesser extent Persian provide loanwords with a rich array of consonant clusters. The introduction of these clusters into the language contravenes a historical tendency within its native core vocabulary to eliminate clusters through processes such as cluster reduction and epenthesis.  lists distinctively Sanskrit/Hindi biconsonantal clusters of initial  and final , and distinctively Perso-Arabic/Urdu biconsonantal clusters of final .

Suprasegmental features
Hindustani has a stress accent, but it is not as important as in English. To predict stress placement, the concept of syllable weight is needed:
 A light syllable (one mora) ends in a short vowel : V
 A heavy syllable (two moras) ends in a long vowel  or in a short vowel and a consonant: VV, VC
 An extra-heavy syllable (three moras) ends in a long vowel and a consonant, or a short vowel and two consonants: VVC, VCC
Stress is on the heaviest syllable of the word, and in the event of a tie, on the last such syllable. If all syllables are light, the penultimate is stressed. However, the final mora of the word is ignored when making this assignment (Hussein 1997) [or, equivalently, the final syllable is stressed either if it is extra-heavy, and there is no other extra-heavy syllable in the word or if it is heavy, and there is no other heavy or extra-heavy syllable in the word]. For example, with the ignored mora in parentheses:

Content words in Hindustani normally begin on a low pitch, followed by a rise in pitch. Strictly speaking, Hindustani, like most other Indian languages, is rather a syllable-timed language. The schwa  has a strong tendency to vanish into nothing (syncopated) if its syllable is unaccented.

See also
 IPA vowel chart with audio 
 IPA pulmonic consonant chart with audio 
 IPA chart (vowels and consonants) - 2015. (pdf file)
 Schwa deletion in Indo-Aryan languages
 Urdu alphabet
 Devanagari

References

Bibliography

 .
 .
 .
 .

 
 .
 .

Hindustani language
Urdu
Indo-Aryan phonologies
Hindi